The Federation of Baptist Associations of Costa Rica (Federación de Asociaciones Bautistas de Costa Rica) is the largest Baptist group in Costa Rica.

History
In 1888, the Jamaica Baptist Missionary Society sent J. H. Sobey to labor in Costa Rica. Four Baptist churches formed the Baptist Convention of Costa Rica in 1947. This convention labored in cooperation with the Southern Baptist Convention until a dispute arose in 1980 and the relationship was severed. In 1981, those wishing to continue cooperation with the Southern Baptist Convention organized the National Union of Baptist Churches.

In 1995, the Baptist Convention of Costa Rica had 24 churches with about 3500 members.

See also
 Bible
 Born again
 Baptist beliefs
 Worship service (evangelicalism)
 Jesus Christ
 Believers' Church

References

Christian organizations established in 1947
Baptist denominations established in the 20th century
Baptist denominations in North America
1947 establishments in Costa Rica